Cape Royal is a 7,880+-cliff-elevation summit located in the eastern Grand Canyon, Coconino County of northern Arizona, United States. It is the southernmost viewpoint of the North Rim, viewing from north-northeast, south, west, southwest. Its next viewpoint northwest is Honan Point, with Thor Temple directly below. Directly east-northeast is the major viewing point of Cape Final, which gives views almost directly north. The 1/2 mile Cape Royal Trail starts at the parking lot and ends at the overlook at Cape Royal. From Cape Royal, directly southeast can be seen the massif and highpoint of Freya Castle, and southeasterly is massive Wotans Throne, which is a surviving section of the North Rim, with a Ponderosa Pine, forested, flat prominence. The cliffs of Cape Royal are composed of Kaibab Limestone, on erodible Toroweap Formation, upon white cliffs of Coconino Sandstone. The watershed drainage from Cape Royal, overlooks the Unkar Creek and Canyon to the south into the Colorado River, about 6 miles distant.

Gallery
 Cape Final & Jupiter Temple; views ~east-northeast, to Cape Final.

 Vishnu Temple and Freya Castle

 Wotans Throne and Angels Gate; viewed ~south-southwest, 1.5 miles distant.

See also
 Geology of the Grand Canyon area
 Atoko Point

References

External links

 Cape Royal, mountainzone.com
 Cape Royal, americansouthwest.net

Cliffs of Arizona
Grand Canyon
 Grand Canyon National Park
 Grand Canyon, Walhalla Plateau
Colorado Plateau
Kaibab National Forest
Landforms of Coconino County, Arizona
Scenic viewpoints in Grand Canyon National Park